John Whitehead Peard (1811–1880) was a British soldier, renowned as 'Garibaldi's Englishman'. He was the second son of Vice-Admiral Shuldham Peard. At one point of his life he lived in Penquite, a manor house in rural Cornwall, near Golant on the River Fowey.

The Sacramento Daily Union wrote, "Peard accompanied Garibaldi through several of his campaigns, and was warmly thanked for his services by the great Italian.  He wrote some letters on the campaign and excited some indignation by his description of the way in which he "potted" the Austrian Generals and other officers with his rifle.

He had an important role in 1860 during the Expedition of the thousand, where he acted as Garibaldi's "double", bewildering the enemy's headquarters, causing the retreat of the enemy from Salerno and later from Naples. 

After the landing in Naples on 15 October 1860 of the volunteers of the British Legion he was their commanding officer.

The importance of Peard during the Expedition was awarded by king Victor Emmanuel II with the cross of the Order of Valour and Peard was known in England as "Garibaldi’s Englishman", in Rome at the Janiculum, a marble bust is present amid the Statues and monuments of patriots on the Janiculum: George Peard, "Il garibaldino inglese".

His reputation among the Britons under his command, however, suffered, with one describing him as a "bloodthirsty man, who, unable to gratify his penchant for murders in his own country, comes out here and gloats over his victims".
 
When Garibaldi finally retired to Caprera, Colonel Peard, who was the second son of Admiral Peard, returned to his native county of Cornwall, where he became High Sheriff and Colonel of Volunteers."

His niece was the novelist Frances Mary Peard.

References

Peard, John Whitehead - Oxford Dictionary of National Biography (Online Edition)

Alumni of Exeter College, Oxford
Deputy Lieutenants of Cornwall
British Militia officers
1811 births
1880 deaths
People of the Italian unification